The Kawasaki Versys 1000 is a dual-sport motorcycle produced since 2012 by Kawasaki, equipped with a four-cylinder engine with a capacity of 1043cm³ originating from Kawasaki Z1000. This is the largest model in the Versys family, whose name is a combination of the words versatile system.

References 

Versys 1000
Motorcycles introduced in 2012